Irina Snopova (born 7 June 1995) is a Russian handball player for HC Astrakhanochka and the Russian national team.

International honours 
EHF Cup:
Semifinalist: 2014
Youth World Championship:
Silver Medalist: 2012

References

1995 births
Living people
Sportspeople from Volgograd
Russian female handball players